"Douce Dame Jolie", sometimes referred to only as 'Douce Dame', is a song from the 14th century, by the French composer Guillaume de Machaut. The song is a virelai, belonging to the style ars nova, and is one of the most often heard medieval tunes today. Many modern recordings omit the lyrics, however.  

One of the most famous musical pieces of the Middle Ages, 'Douce Dame' has been performed by a plethora of artists, mostly but not always in medieval style. Among others are Annwn (with lyrics), Ayragon (with lyrics), Theo Bleckmann (with lyrics), Els Berros de la Cort, Corvus Corax, Schelmish (with lyrics), Dr Cosgill, Fable of the Bees, Filia Irata, Två fisk och en fläsk (with lyrics), Wisby Vaganter, A La Via! (with lyrics), Lisa Lynne, The John Renbourn Group (with English lyrics), WirrWahr, Wolfenmond, Saltatio Mortis, Angels of Venice (soprano Christina Linhardt, harpist Carol Tatum) and Legião Urbana (no lyrics, named "A Ordem dos Templários" (The Templar Order))

Lyrics

Original French 

Modern French  translation

English translation
Sweet, lovely ladyfor God's sake do not thinkthat any has sovereigntyover my heart, but you alone.

For always, without treachery
Cherished
Have I you, and humbly
All the days of my life
Served
Without base thoughts.

Alas, I am left begging
For hope and relief;
For my joy is at its end
Without your compassion.

Sweet, lovely lady....

But your sweet mastery
Masters
My heart so harshly,
Tormenting it
And binding
In unbearable love,

So that [my heart] desires nothing
but to be in your power.
And still, your own heart
renders it no relief.Sweet, lovely lady....

And since my malady
Healed
Will never be
Without you, Sweet Enemy,
Who takes
Delight in my torment

With clasped hands I beseech
Your heart, that forgets me,
That it mercifully kill me
For too long have I languished.

''Sweet, lovely lady....

See also
Courtly love
Medieval music
Guillaume de Machaut
List of compositions by Guillaume de Machaut

References

Stanley, John. Classical Music: An Introduction to Classical Music Through the Great Composers & Their Masterworks, 1994 John Stanley.
Hindely, Geoffrey, editor. Larousse Encyclopedia of Music, 1971 The Hamlyn Publishing Group Limited

14th-century songs
Compositions by Guillaume de Machaut
Medieval compositions